The 2000 Summer Olympics were held in Sydney, Australia, from 15 September to 1 October 2000. 10,651 athletes from 199 National Olympic Committees (NOC) countries participated. The competition was made up of 300 events in 28 sports were held; 165 events were opened to men, 127 were opened to women and 10 were mixed events.

{| id="toc" class="toc" summary="Contents"
|-
| style="text-align:center;" colspan=3|Contents
|-
|
Archery
Athletics
Badminton
Baseball
Basketball
Boxing
Canoeing
Cycling
Diving
Equestrian
Fencing
|valign=top|
Field hockey
Football
Gymnastics
Handball
Judo
Modern pentathlon
Rowing
Sailing
Shooting
Softball
|valign=top|
Swimming
Synchronized swimming
Table tennis
Taekwondo
Tennis
Triathlon
Volleyball
Water polo
Weightlifting
Wrestling
|-
| style="text-align:center;" colspan="3"| Leading medal winners       Notes       References       Bibliography
|}


Archery

Athletics

Track

Men's events

Women's events

Road

Field

Men's events

Women's events

* Athletes who participated in the heats only and received medals.

Badminton

Baseball

Basketball

Boxing

Canoeing

Slalom

Sprint

Cycling

Road

Track

Mountain bike (MTB)

Diving

Men's events

Women's events

Equestrian

Fencing

Field hockey

Football

Gymnastics

Artistic

Men's events

Women's events

Rhythmic

Trampoline

Handball

Judo

Men's events

Women's events

Modern pentathlon

Rowing

Men's events

Women's events

Sailing

Shooting

Men's events

Women's events

Softball

Swimming

Men's events

Women's

* Swimmers who participated in the heats only and received medals.

Synchronized swimming

Table tennis

Taekwondo

Tennis

Triathlon

Volleyball

Beach

Indoor

Water polo

Weightlifting

Men's events

Women's events

Wrestling

Freestyle

Greco-Roman

Leading medal winners
23 competitors won at least three gold medals or three total medals.

See also
 2000 Summer Olympics medal table

References

External links

Bibliography 

 

 

 

 

Medalists
Lists of Summer Olympic medalists by year